The Temptation of St. Tony is a 2009 Estonian film written and directed by Veiko Õunpuu, starring Taavi Eelmaa. The plot has been described as a black comedy and centers around a successful, middle aged man who becomes interested in questions about morality. The film was a co-production between companies from Estonia, Sweden and Finland.

Cast
 Taavi Eelmaa as Tõnu
 Ravshana Kurkova as Nadezhda
 Tiina Tauraite as Tõnu's wife
 Sten Ljunggren as Herr Meister
 Denis Lavant as Count Dionysos Korzybski
 Hendrik Toompere Jr. as Toivo
 Katariina Lauk as Toivo's wife
 Harry Kõrvits as Director
 Taavi Teplenkov as Urbo
 Marika Barabanstsikova as Urbo's wife
 Rain Tolk as Kleine Willy
 Liis Lepik as Tõnu's child
 Valeri Fjodorov as Nadezhda's father
 Evald Aavik as Priest
 Andres Puustusmaa as Fence builder

Awards and nominations
Markku Pätilä and Jaagup Roomet were nominated for Best Production Designers at the European Film Awards 2010 for their work on the film. The Temptation of St. Tony was selected as Estonia's submission for the Academy Award for Best Foreign Language Film at the 83rd Academy Awards, but it didn't make the final shortlist.

See also
 List of Estonian submissions for the Academy Award for Best Foreign Language Film
 List of submissions to the 83rd Academy Awards for Best Foreign Language Film
 The Temptation of St. Anthony
 The temptation of St. Anthony in visual arts

References

External links
 Official website
 
 

2009 films
Estonian comedy films
Estonian-language films
2009 black comedy films